The following is a list of the world's major cities (either capitals, more than one million inhabitants or an elevation of over ) by elevation. In addition, the country, continental region, latitude and longitude are shown for all cities listed.

While the elevation of cities may vary enormously, this list should represent a notional elevation for each city which is verifiable and reasonably acceptable for comparison. The city proper must have a population of 175,000 or higher to be on the list.

See also
Elevation
List of capital cities by altitude
List of highest large cities in the world
List of highest towns by country
List of European cities by elevation
List of metropolitan areas by population
World's largest municipalities by population
List of national capitals
List of towns
Lists of neighborhoods by city
List of towns and cities with 100,000 or more inhabitants

References

Elevation